Robert Adams (born 6 June 1949) is a former Australian rules footballer who played for Geelong in the Victorian Football League (now known as the Australian Football League).

References 

1949 births
Living people
Geelong Football Club players
Geelong West Football Club players
Australian rules footballers from Victoria (Australia)